Zoran Stevanovic (born in 1964 in Sarajevo, Bosnia and Herzegovina) is a journalist, television producer and executive with broad experience in broadcast management and production, with more than twenty years of television experience internationally.

Currently serving as Spokesperson/Sr. Regional Communications Officer for the United Nations High Commissioner for Refugees Representation Central Europe region, based in Budapest. The head of communications and public information unit, in charge of the implementation of different strategies in nine countries. Previously held Sr. Regional Strategic Communications and Advocacy Officer position for Northern Europe, based in Stockholm, Sweden where he oversaw UNHCR communications and advocacy activities in eight countries.

Prior to joining to UNHCR Zoran Stevanovic was the Director of Newsgathering and Programming for the  N1 (television) news channels, CNN's Exclusive News Affiliate for the Adria region and played an instrumental role in launching N1[, in Bosnia and Herzegovina, Croatia and Serbia.

He worked at CNNs Atlanta Headquarters for more than twelve years as Senior Assignment Editor on the CNN International Desk in Atlanta and shortly after that as Bratislava based UNDP Regional Communications Advisor for Europe and the CIS.

Stevanovic is the recipient of numerous awards, including a "Accolade Turner Broadcasting-CNN" award in 2004 and the Alfred I. DuPont award in 1995 for Best Feature Documentary Film produced by National Film Board of Canada and PBS-FRONTLINE's "Romeo and Juliet in Sarajevo".

Being a graduate of University of Sarajevo School of Journalism (BA in Journalism),  and Singidunum University (MA in Global Media Communications), Zoran Stevanović started his career in 1986 as journalist at "Radio Sarajevo 202", and few years later at "Omladinski Radio" in Sarajevo.

References

Bosnia and Herzegovina journalists
Living people
1964 births